Urbain Olivier (1810, Eysins - 1888) was a Swiss writer.

The brother of Juste Olivier, he was well known from 1856 onwards as the author of numerous popular tales of rural life in the Canton of Vaud, especially of the region near Nyon.

External links 
 
 

1810 births
1888 deaths
People from Nyon District
Swiss writers in French